KOUJ-LP (107.1 FM) is a low-power FM radio station licensed to Norman, Oklahoma, United States. The station is currently licensed to Calvary Chapel Of Norman, Incorporated and carries Christian Rock.

History
The callsign was KOUJ-LP on April 16, 2015.

References

External links

OUJ-LP
OUJ-LP
Talk radio stations in the United States
Radio stations established in 2015
2015 establishments in Oklahoma
Bott Radio Network stations